Sinora (Greek "borderland") may refer to:

Sinora, Patras
Sinora, an ancient Greek border fortress on the border of modern Turkey and Armenia, in Turkish Sünür
Sinora (album), Kostas Martakis 2016